The canton of Veuzain-sur-Loire (before 2021: Onzain) is an administrative division of the Loir-et-Cher department, central France. It was created at the French canton reorganisation which came into effect in March 2015. Its seat is in Veuzain-sur-Loire.

It consists of the following communes:
 
Averdon
Champigny-en-Beauce
La Chapelle-Vendômoise
Fossé
Françay
Herbault
Lancôme
Landes-le-Gaulois
Marolles
Mesland
Monteaux
Saint-Bohaire
Saint-Cyr-du-Gault
Saint-Étienne-des-Guérets
Saint-Lubin-en-Vergonnois
Saint-Sulpice-de-Pommeray
Santenay
Valencisse
Valloire-sur-Cisse
Veuzain-sur-Loire
Villefrancœur

References

Cantons of Loir-et-Cher